This is a list of women artists who were born in Bosnia and Herzegovina or whose artworks are closely associated with that country.

A
Azra Aksamija (active since c.2000), artist, architectural historian

H
Nela Hasanbegović (born 1984), sculptor

J
Adela Jusic (born 1982), contemporary artist

K
Šejla Kamerić (born 1976), contemporary artist
Helena Klakocar (born 1958), alternative cartoonist
Maya Kulenovic (born 1975), Yugoslavian-born Canadian painter

M
Ksenia Milicevic (born 1942), Yugoslavian-born French painter

S
Alma Selimovic (born 1981), mixed media art works and fibreglass sculptures

-
Bosnia and Herzegovina women artists, List of
Artists
Artists